Ekins may refer to:

People
Bud Ekins (1930-2007), American stuntman
Charles Ekins (1768-1855), Royal Navy officer
Dave Ekins (b. 1932), American off-road racer
George Ekins (1871-?), English footballer
Jeffery Ekins (d. 1791), English clergyman
Joe Ekins (b. 1924), British army soldier
Paul Ekins (b. 1950), British academic and economist

Ships
, a British frigate that served in the Royal Navy from 1943 to 1945

See also
Eakins
Ekin
Ekins Island
George Ekins Browne